John "James" Wright (born 1892 in Ireland) was a professional footballer, who played for Cliftonville and Huddersfield Town.

References

1892 births
Year of death missing
Republic of Ireland association footballers
Association football defenders
English Football League players
Cliftonville F.C. players
Huddersfield Town A.F.C. players
NIFL Premiership players
Place of birth missing